Ismayil Zulfugarli (born 16 April 2001) is an Azerbaijani footballer who plays as a winger for Neftçi Baku in the Azerbaijan Premier League.

Club career
On 19 August 2019, Zulfugarli made his debut in the Azerbaijan Premier League for Neftçi Baku match against Sabah.

Honours
Keşla
 Azerbaijan Cup: 2017–18

References

External links
 

2001 births
Living people
Association football midfielders
Azerbaijani footballers
Azerbaijan youth international footballers
Azerbaijan Premier League players
Neftçi PFK players